This is a list of casinos in Mississippi.

List of casinos

Gallery

See also

List of casinos in the United States 
List of casino hotels

References

External links

Casinos - VisitMississippi.org

 

 
Mississippi
Casinos